Huang Cheng-wei (born 11 February 1984 in Taiwan) is a Taiwanese baseball player who played for the Brother Elephants of the Chinese Professional Baseball League. He currently plays as Central Fielder for the Elephants. In the 2008 season, he won the Golden Glove Award.

Career statistics

Awards
 CPBL Golden Glove Award (2008)

See also
 Chinese Professional Baseball League
 Brother Elephants

References

External links
 

1984 births
Living people
Brother Elephants players
Baseball players from Tainan
Baseball outfielders